Rutilated quartz is a variety of quartz which contains acicular (needle-like) inclusions of rutile. It is used for gemstones. These inclusions mostly look golden, but they also can look silver, copper red or deep black. They can be distributed randomly or in bundles, which sometimes are arranged star-like, and they can be sparse or dense enough to make the quartz body nearly opaque. While otherwise inclusions often reduce the value of a crystal, rutilated quartz is valued for the quality and beauty of these inclusions.

References 
4. Reference to rutilated quartz in "Closer to the Heart", Mercedes Lackey, Author.

Minerals
Quartz varieties
Dielectrics
Piezoelectric materials
Trigonal minerals
Luminescent minerals
Quartz gemstones